Boronia clavata, commonly known as Bremer boronia, is a plant in the citrus family, Rutaceae and is endemic to the south-west of Western Australia. It is a shrub with bipinnate leaves and pale, yellowish green, four-petalled flowers.

Description
The eight stamens are club-shaped and alternate in length, those adjacent to the petals are shorter than those adjacent to the sepals.

Taxonomy and naming
Boronia clavata was first formally described in 1971 by Paul Wilson and the description was published in Nuytsia from a specimen collected near the Bremer River by Kenneth Newbey. The specific epithet (clavata) is derived from the Latin word clava meaning "club".

Distribution and habitat
Bremer boronia grows on floodplains and river banks in thickets with other shrubs. It is only known from near Bremer Bay.

Conservation
Boronia clavata is classified as "endangered" under the Environment Protection and Biodiversity Conservation Act 1999 and as "Threatened Flora (Declared Rare Flora — Extant)" by the Department of Environment and Conservation (Western Australia).

References

clavata
Flora of Western Australia
Plants described in 1971
Taxa named by Paul G. Wilson